Pleasant Hill is an unincorporated community in Bienville Parish, Louisiana, United States.

Notes

Unincorporated communities in Bienville Parish, Louisiana
Populated places in Ark-La-Tex
Unincorporated communities in Louisiana